Mary Bouton "Mamah" Borthwick (June 19, 1869 – August 15, 1914) was an American translator who had a romantic relationship with architect Frank Lloyd Wright, which ended when she was murdered. She and Wright were instrumental in bringing the ideas and writings of Swedish feminist Ellen Key to American audiences.  Wright built his famous settlement called Taliesin in Wisconsin for her, in part, to shield her from aggressive reporters and the negative public sentiment surrounding their non-married status.  Both had left their spouses and children in order to live together and were the subject of relentless public censure.

Early life and education
She was born as Mary Bouton Borthwick in Boone, Iowa to Marcus Smith Borthwick (1828–1900) and Almira A. Borthwick (née Bowcock) (1839–1898). She had two sisters: Jessie Octavia Borthwick Pitkin (1864–1901) and Elizabeth Vilitta Borthwick (1866–1946). Borthwick earned her BA and MA at the University of Michigan in 1892 and 1893. She later worked as a librarian in Port Huron, Michigan.

Marriage and family
In 1899, Borthwick married Edwin Cheney, an electrical engineer from Oak Park, Illinois. They had two children: John (1902) and Martha (1905). Before their children, they adopted Mamah Borthwick's niece, Jessie Borthwick Pitkin, when Mamah's sister  (Jessie Octavia Borthwick Pitkin) died during childbirth in 1901.

Relationship with Wright
Borthwick met Frank Lloyd Wright's wife, Catherine, through a social club. Soon after, Edwin commissioned Wright to design them a home in Oak Park, now known as the Edwin H. Cheney House. Mamah's sister, Elizabeth Vilitta Borthwick, lived in an apartment on the lower level of the house.

In 1909, Borthwick and Wright left their spouses and traveled to Europe. Wright returned to the United States around a year later in October of 1910. Meanwhile, Borthwick remained in Europe so that she could obtain a divorce from her husband for the reason of abandonment. During her time in Europe, she began translating the works of the Swedish feminist thinker and writer Ellen Key, whom she admired. In April, 1911, Wright's mother purchased land in her family's valley near Spring Green, Wisconsin so that her son could begin designing a home in which to live with Borthwick after her planned divorce. He named the home Taliesin (Welsh for "Shining Brow"). 

Borthwick returned to the United States in June of 1911. She spent time with her children in Canada through the summer waiting to divorce Edwin Cheney, which she did on August 5, and legally returned to her maiden name. Borthwick joined Wright at Taliesin that month, which was then being constructed. 

The press became aware of the couple living together at Taliesin shortly before Christmas 1911. The editor of the Spring Green newspaper (the Weekly Home News) condemned Wright for bringing scandal to the village. The press, which reported the European trip as a "spiritual hegira", called Borthwick and Wright "soul mates" and also referred to Taliesin as the "love castle" or "love bungalow". Chicago newspapers criticized Wright, implying that he would soon be arrested for immorality, despite statements from the local sheriff that he could not prove that the couple was doing anything wrong. Most of their friends and acquaintances considered their open closeness to be scandalous, especially since Catherine had refused to agree to a divorce. The scandal affected Wright's career for several years; he did not receive his next major commission, the Midway Gardens, until 1913.

Murder 
On August 15, 1914, Julian Carlton, a male servant from Barbados who had been hired several months earlier and was apparently mentally unstable, set fire to the living quarters of Taliesin and murdered seven people with an axe as they fled the burning structure. The dead included Borthwick; her two visiting children, John and Martha Cheney; David Lindblom, a gardener; a draftsman named Emil Brodelle; Thomas Bunker, a workman; and Ernest Weston, the son of Wright's carpenter William Weston, who himself was injured but survived. Thomas Fritz also survived the mayhem, and Weston helped to put out the fire that almost completely consumed the residential wing of the house. In hiding, Carlton swallowed muriatic acid immediately following the attack in an attempt to kill himself. When found, he was nearly lynched on the spot, but was instead taken to the Dodgeville jail. Carlton died from starvation seven weeks after the attack, despite medical attention. At the time of the attack, Wright was overseeing work on Midway Gardens in Chicago.

In popular culture 
A detailed nonfiction account of the tragedy at Taliesin is provided in Death in a Prairie House: Frank Lloyd Wright and the Taliesin Murders by William R. Drennan.

Borthwick's time with Frank Lloyd Wright is the basis of Loving Frank, a novel by Nancy Horan. Mamah is also a subject of T.C. Boyle's 2009 twelfth novel, The Women.

An opera, Shining Brow, covers the story of the Cheneys and the Wrights, from when they meet in Wright's office, through the aftermath of Borthwick's death. Music was composed by American composer Daron Hagen with a libretto by Paul Muldoon. The death of Borthwick is described in the book The Rise of Endymion by Dan Simmons in a back-story of the persona of Frank Lloyd Wright.

Notes

External links

 
 
 

1869 births
1914 deaths
1914 murders in the United States
20th-century American translators
20th-century American women writers
American librarians
American women librarians
Swedish–English translators
People murdered in Wisconsin
American murder victims
Female murder victims
Axe murder
Frank Lloyd Wright
Stabbing attacks in the United States
People from Boone, Iowa
People from Spring Green, Wisconsin
University of Michigan alumni
Writers from Iowa